Statistics of Liberian Premier League in season 1996.

Overview
Junior Professionals won the championship.

References
Liberia - List of final tables (RSSSF)

Football competitions in Liberia
Lea